Lady Anne Clifford, Countess of Dorset, Pembroke and Montgomery, suo jure 14th Baroness de Clifford (30 January 1590 – 22 March 1676) was an English peeress. In 1605 she inherited her father's ancient barony by writ and became suo jure 14th Baroness de Clifford. She was a patron of literature and as evidenced by her diary and many letters was a literary personage in her own right. She held the hereditary office of High Sheriff of Westmorland which role she exercised from 1653 to 1676.

Origins
Lady Anne was born on 30 January 1590 in Skipton Castle, and was baptised the following 22 February in Holy Trinity Church in Skipton in the West Riding of Yorkshire. She was the only surviving child and sole heiress of George Clifford, 3rd Earl of Cumberland (1558–1605) of Appleby Castle in Westmorland and of Skipton Castle, by his wife, Lady Margaret Russell, daughter of Francis Russell, 2nd Earl of Bedford. Her childhood tutor was the poet Samuel Daniel.

Inheritance
On the death of her father on 30 October 1605, she succeeded suo jure to the ancient title Baroness de Clifford, a barony created by writ in 1299, but her father's earldom passed (according to the patent of its creation) as was usual, to the heir male, namely his younger brother Francis Clifford, 4th Earl of Cumberland (1559–1641), to whom he had willed his estates. He had bequeathed to Anne the sum of £15,000. In her young adulthood, she engaged in a long and complex legal battle to obtain the family estates, which had been granted by King Edward II (1307–1327) under absolute cognatic primogeniture, instead of the £15,000 willed to her. 

Her main argument was that she was just 15 years old at the time. In January 1617, the queen, Anne of Denmark, encouraged Anne Clifford to pursue her claim and not accept a settlement promoted by James VI and I. It was not until the death in 1643 without a male heir of Henry Clifford, 5th Earl of Cumberland, the 4th Earl's only son, that Anne Clifford managed to regain the family estates, although she did not obtain possession until 1649.

Early years
Her parents' marriage was soured by the deaths of Anne's two elder brothers before the ages of 5 and her parents lived apart for most of her childhood.  The strain of the marriage was seen in the public realm as well, especially after the separation. Her father maintained an important position at the court of Elizabeth I, while her mother received no recognition in regard to her husband at court. As her parents were separated, her mother maintained a matriarchal position in her house, for the family was kept under her care. She was brought up in an almost entirely female household—evoked in Emilia Lanier's Description of Cookeham—and received an excellent education from her tutor, Samuel Daniel the poet. As a child, she was a favourite of Queen Elizabeth I.

She danced in masques with Queen Anne of Denmark, consort of King James I, and played the Nymph of the Air in Samuel Daniel's masque Tethys's Festival, and played roles in several of the early court masques by Ben Jonson, including The Masque of Beauty (1608) and The Masque of Queens (1609). In April 1613 she joined Anne of Denmark's progress to Bath.

Marriages and children
Lady Anne married twice:
 Firstly on 27 February 1609 to Richard Sackville, 3rd Earl of Dorset (d.1624). Sackville's grandfather had arranged the marriage, writing in April 1607 to ask the courtier George More of Loseley to influence the Countess of Cumberland for the match with "that virtuous young lady the Lady Anne". The old Earl of Dorset had to counter rumours against his family honour that he trumped negotiations for her hand from the heir to the Earl of Exeter. By her first husband Anne had five children, three sons who all died before adulthood and two daughters and co-heiresses:
 Lady Margaret Sackville (1614–1676), elder daughter, wife of John Tufton, 2nd Earl of Thanet (1609–1664), by whom she had eleven children. The title Baron de Clifford thenceforth descended in the Tufton family.
 Lady Isabella Sackville (1622–1661), younger daughter, wife of James Compton, 3rd Earl of Northampton (1622–1681). Her children died without progeny, and her share of the Clifford maternal inheritance reverted to the Earls of Thanet, her sister's family.
 Secondly in 1630, as his second wife, she married Philip Herbert, 4th Earl of Pembroke and 1st Earl of Montgomery, KG, (1584–1650), whose first wife, Lady Susan de Vere had died the year before.  
Both marriages were reportedly difficult; contemporaries cited Lady Anne's unyielding personality as a cause, whilst her cousin Edward Russell, 3rd Earl of Bedford, compared her to the River Rhone. A more sympathetic view might blame some of the troubles in her first marriage on her husband's extravagance and his infidelities. Her first husband was a prominent figure at court. Her disagreement with her husband over her inheritance claims proved another source of difficulty within their marriage. Lord Dorset believed she should settle the inheritance case rather than pursue it through the courts. In disagreeing with and defying her husband's wishes, Lady Anne was breaking with the norm of obedience to her husband. A central conflict with her second husband lay in her decision to allow her younger daughter to make her own choice of husband.

A list or catalogue of the household and family of the Earl and Countess of Dorset at Knole survives. It records the names and roles of servants. It includes two African servants, Grace Robinson, a maid in the laundry, and John Morockoe, who worked in the kitchen. Both are described as "Blackamoors". Lady Anne frequently went to London, and met Lady Ruthin. Lady Ruthin was a contact at court, and took Anne Clifford's gifts to the queen Anne of Denmark, including a white satin gown embroidered with pearls and coloured silks.

Patron of arts

She was an important patron of literature and due to her own writings in the form of letters and the diary she kept from 1603 to 1616, was a literary figure in her own right. John Donne said of her that she could "discourse of all things from Predestination to Slea-silk".

Anne Clifford attended the royal court in November 1617, wearing a "green damask gown embroidered, without a farthingale". She gave Anne of Denmark an expensive satin skirt with £100 worth of embroidery. She last saw King James in January 1620 at Whitehall Palace after a masque in the Banqueting House. The show was Ben Jonson's News from the New World Discovered in the Moon.

Jan van Belcamp painted a huge triptych portrait of Anne Clifford to her own design and specifications. Titled The Great Picture, it portrays Lady Anne at three points in her life: at age 56 (right), at age 15 (left), and before birth in her mother's womb (centre). In connection with the painting, Anne Clifford dated her own conception at 1 May 1589, an unusual act of precision. The painting can now be seen in the Abbot Hall Art Gallery in Kendal, Cumbria.

Anne sent a miniature portrait of herself to her mother the Countess of Cumberland in June 1615, writing, "I have sent you my picture done in little, which some says is very like me, and others say it does me rather wrong than flatters me, I know you will accept the shadow of her whose substance is come from yourself. I hope you will requite me with the same kindness and let me have yours when either you come up to London, or when so ever any that draw pictures comes into those parts where now you are."

Building works
In 1656 she erected the Countess Pillar near Brougham, Cumbria, in memory of her late mother. This was the site of her last meeting with her mother in 1616. On the low stone beside it, money was given to the poor on the anniversary of their parting. This is commemorated annually on 2 April.

She restored churches at Appleby-in-Westmorland, Ninekirks, Brougham and Mallerstang. She was also responsible for the improvement and expansion of many of the Clifford family's castles across Northern England, including Skipton Castle in Yorkshire and Pendragon Castle, Brough Castle, Appleby Castle and Brougham Castle, all in Westmorland (now Cumbria).

Later life and death
After inheriting her father's estates in Westmorland, by way of outliving the male heirs (her uncle and cousin), Lady Anne became a wealthy landowner. She was heavily involved with her tenants to the point of filing lawsuits against them and actively pursuing rents and debts owed to her. This was to be the demeanour of her power in later life, that of a direct landowner calling upon the traditions of the baronial class. After moving north, she rotated her residence amongst her castles, living in various ones for several months to a year at a time. She died aged 86 at Brougham Castle, in the room in which her father had been born and her mother had died. At her death she was the Dowager Countess of Dorset, Pembroke, and Montgomery. Her tomb and monument is in St Lawrence's Church, Appleby-in-Westmorland.

Notes

References
Clifford, Lady Anne. The Diaries of Lady Anne Clifford. Ed. D. J. H. Clifford. Gloucestershire: The History Press, 2009.
Demers, Patrica A.  Women's Writing in English: Early Modern England. Toronto, University of Toronto Press, 2005.
Holmes, Martin. Proud Northern Lady: Lady Anne Clifford 1590-1676. Phillimore & Co., 1975. (reprinted many times)
Richardson, Jerusha D. Famous Ladies of the English Court. H. Stone, 1899.
Snook, Edith. Women, Reading, and the Cultural Politics of Early Modern England. London, Ashgate, 2005.
Williamson, George. Lady Anne Clifford Countess of Dorset, Pembroke and Montgomery 1590–1676: Her Life, Letters, and Work. 2nd edition, East Ardley, S.R. Publishers, 1967.

Further reading

External links
Anne Clifford: A Life in Portrait and Print  (University of Huddersfield)
"The Great Picture", commissioned by Lady Anne Clifford, 1646. (Google Arts & Culture)
"A walk through Mallerstang, Cumbria

Lady Anne Clifford records in the Hothfield of Appleby Castle collection at Cumbria Archive Centre, Kendal

1590 births
1676 deaths
De Clifford, Anne, 18th Baroness
Dorset, Anne Clifford, Countess of
16th-century English women
16th-century English nobility
17th-century English women
17th-century English nobility
High Sheriffs of Westmorland
Patrons of literature
English diarists
Anne
Anne
Daughters of British earls
Wives of knights
Women diarists
17th-century philanthropists
Barons de Clifford
17th-century diarists